The Order of the White Eagle is Poland's highest order awarded to both civilians and the military for their merits. It was officially instituted on 1 November 1705 by Augustus II the Strong, King of Poland and Elector of Saxony, and bestowed on eight of his closest diplomatic and political supporters. It is one of the oldest distinctions in the world still in use.

It is awarded to the most distinguished Poles and the highest-ranking representatives of foreign countries. The Order of the White Eagle is attached to a purple ribbon slung over the left shoulder to the right side. The star of the Order, once embroidered, is worn on the left side of the chest.

History

The badge of the Order of the White Eagle was originally a red enamel oval gold medal with an image of the Polish white eagle on its front side, and the royal cypher of Augustus II the Strong over crossed swords on its reverse side, worn on a light blue ribbon. The white eagle badge was replaced by a Maltese cross badge in 1709. By 1713 it was worn from the neck, with a blue sash, and a star. Augustus limited the number of knights to 72, but only conferred the Order 40 times before his death in 1733. His son, Augustus III, however, awarded the Order more than three hundred times. Augustus may have been inspired to found the Order by the example of Peter the Great's recent founding of the Russian Order of Saint Andrew (of which he himself had been made one of the first knights by the Russian emperor), and above all by the example of the prestigious French Order of the Holy Spirit, with which the light blue ribbon, and the star with a bird, have a strong resemblance, and which had also inspired Peter the Great's Order of Saint Andrew.

Initially the creation of the Order was strongly opposed by many of the Polish nobility, since membership in the Order conferred a distinction which violated the traditional equality of all Polish nobles. Since the Order had no patron saint, Augustus II made 2 August the feast of the Order. His son, Augustus III, however, changed the Order's feast day to 3 August.

Under the Third Partition of Poland in 1795, the Order was abolished. It was renewed in 1807 as the highest award of the Duchy of Warsaw. From 1815 to 1831, it was awarded by the Russian-controlled Kingdom of Poland.

After Russian troops put down the Polish uprising of 1830-31, the Order of the White Eagle was officially "annexed" by Nicholas I, and on 17 November 1831 became part of the Russian Imperial honors system. The insignia of this new Imperial Russian Order of the White Eagle was modified to more closely resemble those of Russian orders. It remained in this form until the Russian Revolution of 1917, in which the Russian Empire fell.

The Order of the White Eagle officially became Poland's highest decoration by act of Parliament of 4 February 1921, and the insignia was redesigned. During the interbellum (1921-1939), the Order was awarded to 24 Polish citizens and 87 foreigners, among whom were 33 monarchs and heads of state, 10 prime ministers and 15 other ministers of state, and 12 members of royal families.

After 1948, when the Polish People's Republic came into existence, the Order of the White Eagle was no longer awarded, but it was never officially abolished. It was also used by the Polish Government in Exile. Following the collapse of Communism, the Order was once again reinstated on 26 October 1992, the Polish Government-in-Exile having already presented the seal and archives of the Order to Lech Wałęsa. The first person to be awarded the White Eagle after its reinstatement was Pope John Paul II. The President of Poland as the country's head of state is the Grand Master of the Order.

1713 Insignia

The 1713 badge was a Maltese cross enameled red with white borders with diamonds set in each of the balls at the eight points of the cross and with diamond set rays appearing between each of the points of the cross, i.e., a larger longer ray between each arm of the cross and a smaller ray between each of the two points of these arms. In the centre of the cross was a white enamelled eagle in high relief with spread wings and facing left and with a diamond set royal crown on its head.  At the top of the cross between the two top points was a diamond studded semi-circular link through which passed a diamond studded ring through which, in turn, passed the light-blue ribbon from which it was worn. The reverse side of this Maltese cross was enamelled white with red borders and had at its center an oval gold medallion with the founder's crowned royal cypher above two crossed swords taken from his arms as the Arch-Marshall of the Holy Roman Empire.

The star of the order consisted of an eight-pointed gold star with straight rays which bore a red-bordered white enamelled cross pattée with golden rays between the arms and with a golden rosette at its centre. The arms of this cross pattée bore the motto "Pro Fide, Lege et Rege" (For Faith, Law and the King) in golden letters.

The King of Poland could also wear the cross from a collar of 24 alternating links of white enameled eagles, crowned and holding scepters and orbs, and dark blue enameled ovals, surrounded by gold rays, bearing alternatively full-length enamelled images of the Virgin Mary crowned, dressed in pink and pale blue and supporting the Christ Child on her left arm and holding a gold scepter in her right hand and the letters of her name, "MARIA", arranged into a stylized monogram in white enamel. This collar was made for the coronation of Stanisław II Augustus, the last King of Poland, but the coat of arms of the founder, Augustus the Strong, show the cross of the Order hanging from a collar of a very different design.

Insignia during the Partitions

The badge of the order consisted of a gold crowned double-headed eagle enamelled in black, with a cross superimposed upon its chest: this was a gold Maltese cross enamelled in red with white enamel outline and golden rays between the arms. A white enamel crowned eagle with spread wings, facing left (the coat-of-arms of Poland) was superimposed on the cross. On its reverse side the double-headed eagle bore in the center of its back a diminutive red-bordered white-enamelled cross pattée with a gold rosette at its center gold rays between its arms. The black double-headed eagle hung by its two crowned heads from an enamelled Russian imperial crown, which, in turn, hung from a dark blue silk moire ribbon.

The star of the order consisted of an eight-pointed gold star with straight rays; the central golden disc bore a red-bordered white enamelled cross pattée with a golden rosette at its center and golden rays between the arms, surrounded by a blue enamel ring bearing the motto "Pro Fide, Lege et Rege" (For Faith, Law and the King).

Insignia after 1921
The badge of the order consists of a gold Maltese cross enamelled in red with white enamel outline and with golden palmette-like rays between the arms. A white enamel crowned eagle with spread wings, facing left (the coat-of-arms of Poland) is superimposed on the cross. It is worn on a plain light blue sash. This design clearly reflects a return to the essential design of the 1713 badge, but without the diamonds of the earlier badge.  The reverse side of the badge bears the same Maltese Cross with golden rays as the front side and this cross bears the same design as that of the star of the order (see below), except that the arms of the cross are not enamelled red, i. e., only the outline of the cross and its central disc with its surrounding oak wreath are enamelled. The star or plaque of the order consists of an eight-pointed silver star with straight rays, with a gold Maltese cross, enamelled in red with white enamel outline and with golden palmette-like rays between the arms, superimposed upon it. The motto of the order, „Za Ojczyznę i Naród” ("For Fatherland and Nation"), appears on the arms of the cross. The central disc is in white enamel with the monogram "RP" (Rzeczpospolita Polska) surrounded by a green enamelled oak wreath.

Recipients of the Order

This is a list of some of those who have been invested in the Order, now awarded in recognition of significant service, both military and civil, in the interests of Poland.

From Poland

Others

See also
 Polish military eagle
 2019 Dresden heist
Orders, decorations, and medals of Poland

References

External links

 The Order of the White Eagle by Rafal Heydel-Mankoo
 Picture of the Order of the White Eagle

 
Awards established in 1705
White Eagle (Poland), Order of the
1705 establishments in the Polish–Lithuanian Commonwealth